Salisbury is the second studio album by British rock band Uriah Heep, released in January 1971 by Vertigo Records. It was produced by Gerry Bron.

Unlike their first album, songwriting credits for fully half of the record were attributed to Ken Hensley alone, as opposed to the debut's collaborative partnership of frontman David Byron and guitarist Mick Box. Soon after the release, drummer Keith Baker left the band, replaced by Ian Clark (from another Vertigo band, Cressida). With Clark, the band embarked on their first US tour, supporting Three Dog Night and Steppenwolf.

Musical style
Salisbury is skewed toward the progressive rock genre, with its 16-minute title track featuring a 24-piece orchestra and was also significant for Hensley's instant rise to a position as main composer of the group's music.

Cover art
The front cover of the album depicted a British Chieftain tank, which connects to the title, as Salisbury Plain in Wiltshire, England, is a military training area. The original LP release was a gatefold sleeve, with a black-and-white image of the underside of a Chieftain tank on the inside with the turret facing the rear, over which were printed Hensley's comments on each track. Later reissues would be in a single sleeve. The American release on Mercury Records featured a different cover image (a man tearing out of his own skin), as did the original Canadian pressings. Subsequent Canadian pressings used the UK artwork.

Release
The album was reissued by Bronze Records later in 1971 after the band signed to that label for their third album. Salisbury was remastered and reissued by Castle Communications in 1996 with two bonus tracks, and again in 2003 in an expanded deluxe edition. In 2016, Sanctuary Records released a two-disc deluxe edition.

Reception

According to AllMusic reviewer, the album perfected Uriah Heep's "blend of heavy metal power and prog rock complexity" and "is too unfocused for the casual listener but offers enough solid songs for the Uriah Heep completist." Canadian journalist Martin Popoff described the album as "a dark downer" and "a failed experiment", imputing the cause of the slip to the "prog rock nightmare" of the title track and to "the hatchet production job". William Pinfold of Record Collector, reviewing the 2016 expanded re-issue, considered Salisbury "a collection notable for tightness, precision and a confident breadth of talent", and praised the band for the album's variety.

One of the album's tracks, "Lady in Black", described as "a stylishly arranged tune that builds from a folk-styled acoustic tune into a throbbing rocker full of ghostly harmonies and crunching guitar riffs", became a hit in Germany upon its re-release in 1977 (earning the band the Radio Luxemburg Lion award).

Track listings
All songs copyright Dick James Music, Inc. (BMI)

UK Release

US Release

Personnel
Uriah Heep
 David Byron – lead vocals (except "Lady in Black" and "High Priestess")
 Mick Box – lead guitar, acoustic guitar, backing vocals
 Paul Newton – bass guitar, backing vocals
 Ken Hensley – organ, piano, slide guitar, acoustic guitar, harpsichord, vibraphone, backing vocals, lead vocals on "Lady in Black" and "High Priestess"
 Keith Baker – drums

Additional personnel
John Fiddy –  brass and woodwind arrangement on "Salisbury"

Production
Gerry Bron – producer
Peter Gallen – engineer, mixing
Tom Coyne – mastering

Charts

Album

Singles

References

Uriah Heep (band) albums
1971 albums
Albums produced by Gerry Bron
Vertigo Records albums
Mercury Records albums
Bronze Records albums